Rosa macrophylla, the big-hip rose, is a species of flowering plant in the family Rosaceae, native to the Himalayan region. There are a number of cultivars, including 'Doncasteri', 'Glaucescens', 'Master Hugh', and 'Rubricaulis'. 'Master Hugh' has the largest hips of any readily available rose.

Subtaxa
The following varieties are accepted:
Rosa macrophylla var. glandulifera  – southern Tibet
Rosa macrophylla var. macrophylla – entire range

References

macrophylla
Flora of Afghanistan
Flora of Pakistan
Flora of West Himalaya
Flora of Nepal
Flora of East Himalaya
Flora of Tibet
Flora of South-Central China
Plants described in 1820